The Citicorp Center engineering crisis was the discovery, in 1978, of a significant structural flaw in Citicorp Center, then a recently completed skyscraper in New York City, and the subsequent effort to quietly make repairs over the next few months. The building, now known as Citigroup Center, occupied an entire block and was to be the headquarters of Citibank. Its structure, designed by William LeMessurier, had several unusual design features, including a raised base supported by four offset stilts, and diagonal bracing which absorbed wind loads from upper stories. 

In the original design, potential wind loads for the building were calculated incorrectly. The flaw was discovered by Diane Hartley, an undergraduate student at Princeton University who was writing a thesis on the building which was communicated to the firm responsible for the structural design. However, LeMessurier asserted that he spoke with a young male student of architecture whose questioning prompted him to recalculate the wind loads - now identified as Lee DeCarolis. Concerned about the quartering wind loads should the power to the mass dampers be lost, he investigated the structural integrity of the building. Worried that a high wind could cause the building collapse, reinforcements were made stealthily at night while the offices were open for regular operation during the day. Estimates at the time suggested that the building could be toppled by a  wind, with possibly many people killed as a result. The crisis was kept secret until 1995 and Hartley had no knowledge of the significance of her work until after that time.

The triggering event (according to LeMessurier and Hartley) was known to be high winds and NYC had plans to evacuate Citicorp and the surrounding buildings if high winds did occur. A hurricane did threaten NYC during the retrofitting, but it diverted before arriving.

A NIST re-assessment using modern technology has determined that the quartering wind loads were not the threat that LeMessurier and Hartley had thought. They recommend a reevaluation of the original building design to determine if the retrofitting was warranted.

Background

The Citigroup Center, originally known as Citicorp Center, is a 59-story skyscraper at 601 Lexington Avenue in the Midtown Manhattan neighborhood of New York City. It was designed by architect Hugh Stubbins as the headquarters for First National City Bank (later Citibank), along with associate architect Emery Roth & Sons. LeMessurier Associates and James Ruderman were the structural engineers, and Bethlehem Steel was the steel contractor. The building was dedicated on October 12, 1977. 

As part of Citicorp Center's construction, a new building for St. Peter's Lutheran Church was erected at the northwest corner of the site; by agreement, it was supposed to be separate from the main tower. To avoid the church, the tower is supported by four stilts positioned underneath the centers of each of the tower's edges. (Early plans called for the supports to be placed under the tower's corners, but the agreement with the church prevented that.) To allow this design to work, Bill LeMessurier specified that load-bearing braces in the form of inverted chevrons be stacked above the stilts inside each face of the building. These braces are designed to distribute tension loads that are created by wind from the upper stories down to the stilts. 

The long, multi-story diagonal braces had to be fabricated in sections and assembled on site, requiring five joints in each brace. LeMessurier's original design for the chevron load braces used welded joints. To save money, Bethlehem Steel proposed changing the construction plans to use bolted joints, a design modification that was accepted by LeMessurier's office but not known to the engineer himself until later.

For his original design, LeMessurier calculated wind load on the building when wind blew perpendicularly against the side of the building, as these were the only calculations required by New York City building code. Such winds are normally the worst case, and a structural system capable of handling them can easily cope with wind from any other angle. Thus, the engineer did not specifically calculate the effects of diagonally-oriented "quartering winds".

Discovery
In June 1978, Princeton University engineering student Diane Hartley was writing her senior thesis about Citicorp Center's design at the suggestion of her professor, David Billington. As part of that work she analyzed the structural design and calculated stresses from quartering winds, finding them higher than the maximum expected stress values provided to her by LeMessurier's firm. Billington, in his feedback on Hartley's thesis, also questioned the figures provided by the firm. Hartley asked her contact there about the discrepancy and was assured the building could handle the forces, so she dropped the issue. Hartley's concerns and the response she received are documented in her thesis. LeMessurier was separately designing a similar building with wind braces in Pittsburgh, and a potential contractor questioned the expense of using welded rather than bolted joints. LeMessurier asked his office how the welds went at the Citicorp construction and was then told bolts had been substituted.

In June 1978, LeMessurier was answering questions via phone with a young architectural student now identified as Lee DeCarolis. That phone call convinced him to recalculate the wind loads, including the diagonal wind loads. 

On July 24, 1978, LeMessurier went to his office and conducted calculations on Citicorp Center's design. He found that, for four of the eight tiers of chevrons, such winds would create a 40 percent increase in wind loads and a 160 percent increase in load at the bolted joints. Citicorp Center's use of bolted joints and the increased loads from quartering winds would not have caused concern if these issues had been isolated from each other. However, the combination of the two findings prompted LeMessurier to run tests on the structural safety. The original welded-joint design could withstand the load from straight-on and quartering winds, but a  near-hurricane force quartering wind would exceed the strength of the bolted-joint chevrons. LeMessurier also discovered that his firm had used New York City's truss safety factor of 1:1 instead of the column safety factor of 1:2.

On July 26, LeMessurier visited wind-tunnel expert Alan Garnett Davenport at the University of Western Ontario. Davenport's team conducted calculations on the building and found not only that LeMessurier's modeling was correct, but also that, in a real-world situation, member stresses could increase by more than the 40 percent LeMessurier had calculated. LeMessurier then went to his Maine summer home on July 28 to analyze the issue. With the tuned mass damper active, LeMessurier estimated that a wind capable of toppling the building would occur on average once every 55 years. If the tuned mass damper could not function due to a power outage, a wind strong enough to cause the building's collapse would occur once every 16 years on average.

Repairs
LeMessurier agonized over how to deal with the problem. If the issues were made known to the public, he risked ruining his professional reputation as well as causing panic in the immediate area surrounding the building, as well as to occupants. LeMessurier considered never bringing the issue up, and he also briefly contemplated killing himself before anyone else found out about the defect. LeMessurier ultimately contacted Stubbins's lawyer and his insurance carrier. LeMessurier then contacted Citicorp's lawyers, the latter of which hired Leslie E. Robertson as an expert adviser. Citicorp accepted LeMessurier's proposal to weld steel plates over the bolted joints, and Karl Koch Erecting was hired for the welding process. Very few people were made aware of the issue, besides Citicorp leadership, mayor Ed Koch, acting buildings commissioner Irving E. Minkin, and the head of the welder's union.

Construction crews started installing the welded panels at night in August 1978. Officials made no public mention of any possible structural issues, and the city's three major newspapers had gone on strike. Officials barely acknowledged the issue, instead describing the work as a routine procedure. Henry DeFord III of Citicorp claimed the Citicorp Center could already withstand a 100-year wind and that there were no "noticeable problems in the building at all".  As precautions, emergency generators were installed for the mass damper, strain gauges were placed on critical beams and weather forecasters were engaged. Citicorp and local officials created emergency evacuation plans for the immediate neighborhood. However, these evacuation plans were not publicized at the time. This was in spite of the fact that thousands of people could have been killed in a potential collapse. Six weeks into the work, a major storm (Hurricane Ella) was off Cape Hatteras and heading for New York. With New York City hours away from emergency evacuation, the reinforcement was only half-finished. Ella eventually turned eastward and veered out to sea.

Repairs were completed in October 1978, before the media resumed publishing. LeMessurier claimed a wind strong enough to topple the repaired building would only occur once every 700 years. Stubbins and LeMessurier covered all of the repair costs, which were estimated to be several million dollars.

Publication

Since no structural failure occurred, the work was only publicized in a lengthy article in The New Yorker in 1995. The 1995 story in The New Yorker described the student as a "young man, whose name has been lost in the swirl of subsequent events" who called LeMessurier saying "that his professor had assigned him to write a paper on the Citicorp tower". However, the student apparently never contacted LeMessurier directly. According to the website Online Ethics, when one of LeMessurier's colleagues asked whether the student was female, "LeMessurier responded that he didn't know because he had not actually spoken with the student." LeMessurier had died in 2007 without specifying how much of the exchange between the student and the engineer had been brought to his attention.

Hartley identified herself as the engineering student in 2011, years after the New Yorker article was published. Hartley said she had spoken with Joel S. Weinstein at LeMessurier's office.

The student that LeMessurier spoke to by phone who prompted his recalculation of the wind loads has identified himself in an article posted to OnLineEthics.com. His name is Lee DeCarolis. He learned in 2011 how he played a part in the Citicorp Building history from Einstein’s Refrigerator by Steve Silverman. By that time, LeMessurier had died. While he mentioned his part to acquaintances, and even wrote a play about it, he revealed himself to the public at large only after a NIST reassessment had determined that the wind loads weren't the threat that Hartley and LeMessurier had determined, stating that he could therefore not be accused of seeking or stealing glory.

Ethical questions 
According to the American Institute of Architecture Trust case study, "many have viewed the actions of LeMessurier as nearly heroic, and many engineering schools and ethics educators now use LeMessurier's story as an example of how to act ethically." However, others have criticized LeMessurier for his lack of oversight that led to the issues, as well as his lack of honesty toward neighborhood residents, architects, engineers, and other members of the public when the issues were discovered. Architect Eugene Kremer discussed the ethical questions raised in this case. Kremer mentioned six key points:

 Analysis of wind loads. In his initial plans, LeMessurier relied only on calculations required by building codes, rather than checking all calculations.
 Design changes. The builders had made a quick decision to use bolted joints without consulting LeMessurier.
 Professional responsibility. Before LeMessurier decided to make Citicorp aware of the design defects, he briefly considered concealing the issues instead. 
 Public statements. In press interviews and releases at the time, officials either omitted or lied about details of the defects. 
 Public safety. When Hurricane Ella threatened the city in August and September 1978, evacuation plans for the surrounding area were made in secret.
 Advancement of professional knowledge. Concealing this problem for almost 20 years prevented ethical and engineering learning that could have taken place.

References

Sources 
 
 
 

1978 in New York City
History of structural engineering
Ethics of science and technology
Wind
1978 disasters in the United States
1970s in Manhattan